Zebulon Aiton Lash (September 29, 1846 – January 24, 1920) was a Canadian lawyer, civil servant, and businessman.

Born in St. John's, Newfoundland son of William Lash and Margaret Fannon, Lash was called to the Ontario bar in 1868. He practiced law in Toronto. In 1872, he became a lecturer at Osgoode Hall Law School. In 1876, he started working in the Department of Justice in Ottawa as chief clerk. From September 1, 1876 to May 22, 1882 he was Deputy Minister, succeeding Hewitt Bernard. He was created a Queen's Counsel in 1879 and was elected a bencher of the Law Society of Upper Canada in 1886.

In 1882, he joined Edward Blake's law firm in Toronto best known as Blake, Lash, Anglin, and Cassels.

References

External links
 

1846 births
1920 deaths
19th-century Canadian civil servants
Canadian King's Counsel
Lawyers in Ontario
People from St. John's, Newfoundland and Labrador